The Bukit Tinggi Southern Loop Road, Jalan Baru Berjaya Hills Resort, Federal Route 436, is an institutional facilities federal road in Berjaya Hills Resort, Bukit Tinggi, Pahang, Malaysia. It is a main route to the Berjaya Hills Golf Club and Club House, Meranti Park Suites and Rabbit Park of the Berjaya Hills Resort and also a main route to the Institut Latihan Kesejahteraan Bandar, Perumahaan dan Kerajaan Tempatan (ILKBPKT), a training centre of the Ministry of Urban Wellbeing, Housing and Local Government.

The Kilometre Zero is located at the Berjaya Hills Resort South.

The road was constructed by Gadang Engineering (M) Sdn Bhd on 2002 and was completed on 2004.

At most sections, the Federal Route 436 was built under the JKR R5 road standard, allowing maximum speed limit of up to 50 km/h.

List of junctions

References

Malaysian Federal Roads